Thomas Marshall   was a 16th century English priest.

Marshe was educated at Magdalen College, Oxford. He held livings at Turweston, Bugbrooke, Little Greenford and the City of London (St Bride's, Fleet Street). 
He was Archdeacon of Lincoln from 1554 until his death in 1558.

References

Alumni of Magdalen College, Oxford
Archdeacons of Lincoln
16th-century English people
1558 deaths
Year of birth missing